The To the Moon World Tour was the fifth concert tour by American musician Kid Cudi. The excursion, which was his first tour in five years, also served as his first arena tour. The tour began in Portland on August 18, 2022 and concluded in Milan on November 22, 2022. The tour dates included 26 cities, on three continents.

Background
On December 11, 2020, Kid Cudi released his seventh solo album, the long awaited Man on the Moon III: The Chosen. On September 25, 2021, Cudi revealed he was preparing for an upcoming concert tour in promotion for Man on the Moon III, when he wrote on Twitter that he's "been bookin venues for months." Cudi ultimately announced his first arena tour in June 2022, with To the Moon World Tour. On July 4, 2022, Kid Cudi took to Twitter to announce the release of his first "best-of" album, along with the reissue of his debut mixtape A Kid Named Cudi on July 15 to digital streaming platforms (DSP). He revealed the compilation, titled The Boy Who Flew to the Moon, Vol. 1, would be released on July 8. Following the release of both projects, Cudi revealed on Twitter he would be performing songs from his debut mixtape, as well as "Love", the bonus track from his greatest hits compilation. American musicians Don Toliver, Denzel Curry, 070 Shake, and Strick, were scheduled as the opening acts for the North American leg, however, on August 12, Toliver announced he would not be able to fulfill his duties on the tour due to "production/logistical issues."

Moon Man's Landing

Moon Man's Landing is a one-day music festival that took place on Saturday, September 17, 2022. The event was held at the West Bank Flats in Cudi’s hometown of Cleveland, Ohio. The line-up for the festival includes musicians such as Don Toliver, Playboi Carti, Haim, Bone Thugs-n-Harmony, Pusha T, Jaden and Chip tha Ripper, among others.

Set list
This set list is representative of the first show in Portland, performed on August 18, 2022. It does not represent all concerts for the duration of the tour.

Set list
 "Down & Out"
 "Tequila Shots"
 "She Knows This"
 "Dive"
 "Just What I Am" (featuring King Chip)
 "T.G.I.F." (featuring King Chip)
 "Ghost!"
 "Solo Dolo, Pt. III"
 "By Design"
 "Man on the Moon (The Anthem)"
 "Mr. Rager"
 "The Void"
 "Memories"
 "Pursuit of Happiness" (Steve Aoki Remix)
Encore
 "The Prayer"
 "Love."

Tour dates

Cancelled show

See also
List of songs recorded by Kid Cudi

Notes

References

2022 concert tours
Kid Cudi
Concert tours postponed due to the COVID-19 pandemic